Alexandre Henrique Gonçalves de Freitas  (born 27 August 1991), commonly known as Alex, is a Portuguese professional footballer who plays for S.C.U. Torreense mainly as a left winger.

Club career

Porto
Born in Funchal, Madeira, Alex started his career with local C.D. Nacional. In 2005, the 14-year-old signed for FC Porto and went on to complete his development with the Primeira Liga giants.

During his only season as a senior with the northerners, 2009–10, Alex was summoned to four games with the first team: on 17 October 2009, he played 20 minutes against Sertanense F.C. in the Taça de Portugal after coming on as a substitute for Mariano González in a 4–0 home win. He also remained on the bench in two Taça da Liga matches and the 2–1 group-stage home victory over APOEL FC in the UEFA Champions League.

Santa Clara
In the summer of 2010, Alex signed with C.D. Santa Clara of the Segunda Liga. He appeared in 26 games (19 starts) in his first year with the Azores club.

Alex scored his first goal for the team on 22 October 2011, through a penalty and also providing an assist in a 2–1 home defeat of U.D. Oliveirense. He repeated the feat the following weekend and in the same fashion, helping the visitors draw 2–2 at C.D. Aves.

Guimarães
On 3 July 2013, Alex joined Vitória S.C. on a four-year contract. He was initially assigned to their reserves, in the third division.

Alex managed to find the net in his Portuguese top flight debut on 4 April 2014, but in a 1–3 home loss to G.D. Estoril Praia. On 31 January 2017, having been rarely played over the course of his third and fourth seasons, he was loaned to fellow league side Moreirense F.C. until June. He scored twice during his short spell – including once in a 3–1 home win against Porto – helping to a narrow escape from relegation.

Salernitana
In the 2017 off-season, Alex moved abroad for the first time and signed with U.S. Salernitana 1919 from the Italian Serie B. In the following transfer window, he was loaned to F.C. Pro Vercelli 1892 in the same league.

International career
In 2009, Alex was part of the Portugal under-19 side that failed to make the 2009 UEFA European Championship. As the country qualified for the next edition in France, he contributed four goals in six matches and was picked for the final squad in an eventual group-stage exit.

Alex was selected for Portugal's squad at the 2011 FIFA U-20 World Cup. He played all the games but one in Colombia en route to the second place, scoring in the 3–2 final defeat against Brazil.

Honours
Porto
Taça de Portugal: 2009–10

Portugal U20
FIFA U-20 World Cup runner-up: 2011

Orders
 Knight of the Order of Prince Henry

References

External links
 
 
 
 
 

1991 births
Living people
Sportspeople from Funchal
Portuguese footballers
Madeiran footballers
Association football wingers
Primeira Liga players
Liga Portugal 2 players
Campeonato de Portugal (league) players
FC Porto players
C.D. Santa Clara players
Vitória S.C. B players
Vitória S.C. players
Moreirense F.C. players
Vitória F.C. players
Casa Pia A.C. players
C.D. Cova da Piedade players
S.C.U. Torreense players
Serie B players
U.S. Salernitana 1919 players
F.C. Pro Vercelli 1892 players
Portugal youth international footballers
Portuguese expatriate footballers
Expatriate footballers in Italy
Portuguese expatriate sportspeople in Italy